Abdul Bari Nadvi was an Indian Muslim scholar born in 1886 in the Barabanki district near Lucknow, Uttar Pradesh, India. His father Hakim Abdul Khaliq was a student of Maulana Mohammad Naeem Farangi Mahli. His younger brother Saad-ud-Din Ansari was among the founding members of the Jamia Millia Delhi and taught there for a long time. Abdul Bari Nadvi died in Lucknow on 30 January 1976. He was survived by four sons and two daughters, all of whom are now deceased.

Education

After his early education at a local madrasah he went to Nadwa-tul-Ulama for his higher education. He was well reputed as an established academic and writer in the disciplines of philosophy and theology and taught at Gujarat College in Ahmedabad, Dakkan College in Pune, and Osmania University in Hyderabad from where he retired as professor, having earlier served as Head of the Philosophy Department. He was one of the most capable students of Allama Shibli Nomani and a contemporary of Syed Sulaiman Nadvi, Abdul Salam Nadvi, Abdul Majid Daryabadi, and Manazir Ahsan Gilani. He wrote extensively on religion and philosophy and translated the works of numerous western philosophers and sociologists such as George Berkeley, David Hume, Rene Descartes, Dewey, Henry Bergson, William James, G. F. Stout, and John S. Mackenzie. Some of his works were included in the undergraduate and postgraduate curriculum at Osmania University.

He was influenced in his religious ideology by Maulana Ashraf Ali Thanawi and Maulana Hussain Ahmed Madani, both of whom being students of Sheikh-ul-Hind Maulana Mahmud Hasan Deobandi of the Deobandi movement. His formal spiritual association was with Maulana Madni but he spent more time with Maulana Thanawi.

Career 

Nadvi was entirely educated in Muslim seminaries in India and never studied at a (secular/modern) college or university. He would have learnt most of Aristotelian logic (and Muslim additions and commentary to it), and been exposed to Muslim critics of Aristotelian logic such as Ibn Taymiyya among others. He would have learnt Neo-Platonic Muslim philosophy mainly through the works of Mulla Sadra and through the study of Ilm al Kalam (Muslim theology) he would also have been exposed to the basic ideas of Aristotle's philosophy especially his Metaphysics. Today, modern philosophy is not taught in Muslim seminaries in India and Pakistan (with some exceptions). He taught himself not only English but also philosophy.

After his retirement from Osmania University, he continued writing on philosophy and religion and especially on topics arising from the interaction between philosophy and religion in the Islamic context. Two of his books from this period (related to philosophy) stand out, relating to religion and rationality as well as religion and science. He also wrote a chapter on miracles in Shibli Nomani/Sulaiman Nadvi's multiple-volume biography of Muhammad in which he mainly draws on Hume's ideas to establish the rationality or possibility of miracles.

Written works
Some of his books and papers include:

English translations

 Principles of Human Knowledge (George Berkeley) - translated into Urdu in 1919, Dakkan College Poona - https://archive.org/details/in.ernet.dli.2015.498544
 Manual of Ethics (John S Mackenzie) - translated into Urdu in 1923, Usmania University Hyderabad - https://archive.org/details/in.ernet.dli.2015.449616
 Manual of Psychology (G. F. Stout) - translated into Urdu in 1927, Usmania University Hyderabad - https://www.rekhta.org/ebooks/hadiqa-e-nafsiyat-gf-stout-ebooks
 Introduction to Metaphysics (Henri Bergson) - translated into Urdu in 1931, Usmania University Hyderabad
 Ethics (John Dewey and James Tufts) - translated into Urdu in 1932, Usmania University Hyderabad - https://www.rekhta.org/ebooks/akhlaqiyat-john-dewey-ebooks#
 Discourse on Methods and Meditations on First Philosophy (René Descartes) - translated into Urdu in 1932, Usmania University Hyderabad - https://archive.org/details/in.ernet.dli.2015.522815/page/n5/mode/2up
 William James, some writings from 1902 to 1910 - translated into Urdu in 1937, Usmania University Hyderabad - https://rekhta.org/ebooks/falsafa-e-nataijiyat-sir-william-james-ebooks
 Human Understanding (David Hume) - translated into Urdu in 1938, Usmania University Hyderabad - https://archive.org/details/in.ernet.dli.2015.498091

Urdu books and chapters

 برکلے اور اس کا فلسفہ - 1 n1918, Dakkan College Poona - https://archive.org/details/in.ernet.dli.2015.498545
 معجزات انبیا اور عقلیات جدیدہ - Chapter written in Allama Shibli Nomani/Sulaiman Nadvi's Seerat-ul-Nabi, 1920 - https://archive.org/details/Sirat-un-NabiUrduVolume2 (pages 80–184)
 مذہب اور عقلیات – Lecture delivered in Mohammadan Education Conference in Surat/Gujrat, India 1924 - https://quranwahadith.com/product/mazhab-wa-aqliyat/
 تجدید تعلیم و تبلیغ [7] – 1948 - https://archive.org/details/Tajdeed-e-Taleem-o-TableeghByShaykhAbdulBariNadvir.a
 تجدید تصوف و سلوک - [6] – 1949 - http://islamicbookslibrary.wordpress.com/tag/shaykh-abdul-bari-nadvi-r-a/
 تجدید معاشیات - [4] – 1955 - http://islamicbookslibrary.wordpress.com/2011/10/31/tajdeed-e-muashiyat-by-shaykh-abdul-bari-nadvi-r-a/
 جدید دین کامل[5] – 1956- https://archive.org/stream/Jami-ul-MujadideenByShaykhAbdulBariNadvir.a#page/n0/mode/2up
 نظام صلاح و اصلاح – https://quranwahadith.com/product/nizam-e-salah-wa-islah/  1962
 مذہب اور سائنس –e 1970 - https://archive.org/details/TOOBAA-RESEARCH-LIBRARY-MazhabOScienceAllamaAbdulBariNadvi

Arabic books

 بین التصوف والحیات, published in Damascus and Istanbul
 الدین والعلوم العقلیہ, published in India
 المنھج السلامی لتربیت النفس, published in India

References

1886 births
1976 deaths
People from Barabanki, Uttar Pradesh
20th-century Indian philosophers
Indian Muslims
Muslim writers
Darul Uloom Nadwatul Ulama alumni
Deobandis